Sir Arthur Strachey (5 December 1858 – 14 May 1901) was a British Indian judge and Chief Justice of Allahabad High Court.

Early life
Strachey was born in Calcutta, British India to Sir John Strachey and 	Katherine Jane Batten. He was educated at Uppingham and afterwards at Charterhouse. He was graduated from Trinity Hall, Cambridge in 1880 with second class in the Law tripos. He got the LL.B. degree and was called to the bar from the Inner Temple in 1883.

Career
Strachey returned to British India and started practice at Allahabad High Court at Allahabad. In 1892, he became public prosecutor and standing counsel to the Provincial Government. In 1895 Strachey became a judge of the Bombay High Court. He presided at the first trial for sedition case of Bal Gangadhar Tilak in 1897. In 1899, he was appointed Chief Justice of the Allahabad High Court and knighted on 30 January 1899.

References

1858 births
1901 deaths
Knights Bachelor
Chief justices
Members of the Inner Temple
Chief Justices of the Allahabad High Court
19th-century Indian judges
20th-century Indian judges